Faustino Alonso (born 15 February 1961) is a Paraguayan football forward who played for Paraguay in the 1986 FIFA World Cup. He also played for Club Sol de América.

References

External links
 FIFA profile
 

1961 births
Living people
Sportspeople from Asunción
Paraguayan footballers
Paraguayan expatriate footballers
Association football forwards
Paraguay international footballers
Paraguayan Primera División players
Club Sol de América footballers
Primeira Liga players
Rio Ave F.C. players
Expatriate footballers in Portugal
Paraguayan expatriate sportspeople in Portugal
1986 FIFA World Cup players